Valerianella is a genus of plant in family Caprifoliaceae. Many plants of this genus are known by the common name corn salad or cornsalad, although that name most often refers to Valerianella locusta.

Accepted species:

 Valerianella adylovii M.N.Abdull. 
 Valerianella affinis Balf.f. (believed extinct)
 Valerianella aksaensis M.N.Abdull.
 Valerianella amarella (Lindh. ex Engelm.) Krok – hairy corn salad
 Valerianella amblyotis Fisch. & C.A.Mey. ex Hohen.
 Valerianella anodon Lincz.
 Valerianella antilibanotica Rech.f.
 Valerianella balansae V.A.Matthews
 Valerianella carinata Loisel. – European corn salad
 Valerianella chenopodifolia (Pursh) DC. – goosefoot corn salad
 Valerianella chlorodonta Coss. & Durieu
 Valerianella chlorostephana Boiss. & Balansa
 Valerianella corniculata C.A.Mey.
 Valerianella coronata (L.) DC.
 Valerianella costata (Steven) Betcke
 Valerianella cymbaecarpa C.A.Mey.
 Valerianella dactylophylla Boiss. & Hohen.
 Valerianella dentata (L.) Pollich – narrowfruit corn salad
 Valerianella deserticola Hadac
 Valerianella diodon Boiss.
 Valerianella discoidea (L.) Loisel. 
 Valerianella divaricata Lange
 Valerianella echinata (L.) DC.
 Valerianella eriocarpa Desv. –  Italian corn salad
 Valerianella falconida Shvedtsch.
 Valerianella florifera Shinners – Texas corn salad
 Valerianella glomerata Boiss. & Balansa
 Valerianella godayana Fanlo
 Valerianella hirsutissima Link
 Valerianella kotschyi Boiss.
 Valerianella kulabensis Lipsky ex Lincz.
 Valerianella lasiocarpa (Steven) Betcke
 Valerianella leiocarpa (K.Koch) Kuntze
 Valerianella leptocarpa Pomel
 Valerianella lipskyi Lincz.
 Valerianella locusta (L.) Laterr. – corn salad, lamb's lettuce, mâche, fetticus
 Valerianella longiflora (Torr. & A.Gray) Walp. – longtube corn salad
 Valerianella martini Loscos
 Valerianella microcarpa Loisel.
 Valerianella multidentata Loscos & J.Pardo
 Valerianella muricata (Steven ex M.Bieb.) W.H.Baxter
 Valerianella nuttallii (Torr. & A.Gray) Walp. – Nuttall's corn salad
 Valerianella obtusiloba Boiss.
 Valerianella orientalis (Schltdl.) Boiss. & Balansa
 Valerianella ovczinnikovii Sharipova
 Valerianella oxyrhyncha Fisch. & C.A.Mey.
 Valerianella ozarkana Dyal – Ozark corn salad
 Valerianella palmeri Dyal – Palmer's corn salad
 Valerianella petrovichii Asch.
 Valerianella plagiostephana Fisch. & C.A.Mey.
 Valerianella platycarpa Trautv.
 Valerianella pomelii Batt.
 Valerianella pontica Lipsky
 Valerianella puberula (Bertol.) DC.
 Valerianella pumila (L.) DC.
 Valerianella radiata (L.) Dufr. – beaked corn salad
 Valerianella rimosa Bastard
 Valerianella sclerocarpa Fisch. & C.A.Mey.
 Valerianella stenocarpa (Engelm. ex A.Gray) Krok – narrowcell corn salad
 Valerianella stephanodon Coss. & Durieu
 Valerianella szovitsiana Fisch. & C.A.Mey.
 Valerianella texana Dyal – Edwards Plateau corn salad
 Valerianella triceras Bornm.
 Valerianella triplaris Boiss. & Buhse
 Valerianella tuberculata Boiss.
 Valerianella turgida (Steven) Betcke
 Valerianella turkestanica Regel & Schmalh.
 Valerianella umbilicata (Sull.) Alph.Wood – navel corn salad
 Valerianella uncinata (M.Bieb.) Dufr.
 Valerianella varzobica Sharipova
 Valerianella vesicaria (L.) Moench
 Valerianella vvedenskyi Lincz.
 Valerianella × zoltanii Borbás

References

External links
USDA Plants Profile

 
Caprifoliaceae genera
Taxonomy articles created by Polbot
Taxa named by Philip Miller